During 2014, tropical cyclones formed within seven different tropical cyclone basins, located within various parts of the Atlantic, Pacific and Indian Oceans. During the year, a total of 117 tropical cyclones had formed this year to date. 79 tropical cyclones had been named by either a Regional Specialized Meteorological Center (RSMC) or a Tropical Cyclone Warning Center (TCWC). The most active basin in 2014 was the Western Pacific, which documented 23 named systems, while the Eastern Pacific, despite only amounting to 22 named systems, was its basin's most active since 1992. Conversely, both the North Atlantic hurricane and North Indian Ocean cyclone seasons experienced the fewest cyclones reaching tropical storm intensity in recorded history, numbering 9 and 3, respectively. Activity across the southern hemisphere's three basins—South-West Indian, Australian, and South Pacific—was spread evenly, with each region recording seven named storms apiece. So far, 26 Category 3 tropical cyclones formed, including ten Category 5 tropical cyclones in the year, becoming as the third-most intense tropical cyclone activty on record, only behind with 1997 and 2018.

The strongest of these tropical cyclones was Typhoon Vongfong, which strengthened to a minimum barometric pressure of 900 mbar (hPa) before striking the east coast of Japan. The costliest and deadliest tropical cyclone in 2014 was Typhoon Rammasun, which struck China in July, causing US$8.08 billion in damage. Rammasun killed 222 people; 106 in Philippines, 88 in China and 28 in Vietnam.

Global atmospheric and hydrological conditions

During January 2014, after surveying various climate models, the World Meteorological Organization warned that there was an enhanced possibility of a weak El Niño event happening during 2014. Over the next few months the climate of the Pacific Ocean started to exhibit features that suggested the impending onset of an El Niño event. Over the ocean, these features included: a rapid fall of the sea level in western Micronesia, as well as a large area of enhanced sea surface temperatures that were present at low latitudes near the International Date Line. In the atmosphere these features included persistent westerly winds at equatorial latitudes, which were displaced eastwards towards the Marshall Islands. A large area of atmospheric convection was present at a low latitude near the International Date Line, in association with the development of an unusual amount of early season tropical cyclones near the Marshall Islands. As a result of some of these conditions, an El Niño Watch was issued by the United States Climate Prediction Center (NOAA's CPC) and the International Research Institute for Climate and Society within their March 2014 diagnostic discussion.

Over the next few months, the atmosphere failed to respond in order to reinforce the developing El Niño, with the monsoon trough remaining weak and tropical cyclone activity slowing, while no episodes of strong westerly winds at a low latitude occurred. Some of the oceanic indicators of El Niño also failed to develop further, with a cooling of sea and sub surface temperatures over the tropical Pacific occurring. However, by the end of 2014, several of the El Niño indexes that were used to judge the state of the ENSO state, indicated that weak El Niño conditions had developed over the Pacific Ocean. As a result, a few of the international meteorological agencies, including the Japan Meteorological Agency and the Hong Kong Observatory reported that an El Niño event had developed during 2014, while others such as the Fiji Meteorological Service considered 2014 to be a near miss. At this time it was thought that the ENSO state would continue to hover at the borderline El Niño conditions, before easing back into neutral ENSO conditions.

Summary

North Atlantic Ocean
The 2014 Atlantic hurricane season was one of the least active seasons since 2009, with only eight named storms but had an average activity season in terms of hurricanes and a slightly below average season in terms of major hurricanes

Systems
A total of 114 systems formed globally in 2014 with 71 of them causing significant damage, deaths, and/or setting records for their basin.

January

The month of January was very active with 18 systems, starting with Ian bringing damages in Fiji and Tonga. 
Adding on, Lingling was the first disturbance in the West Pacific, affecting Philippines. Colin became the strongest tropical cyclone in the month of January this 2014, but it stayed well from land. 14 more disturbances formed on different basins, 6 are named by their respective meteorological agencies.

February

In the month of February, 11 systems formed, of which 6 were named. Typhoon Faxai became the strongest tropical cyclone of the month, affecting the Caroline Islands and the Mariana Islands. Edilson brought considerable damages and heavy rainfall to Mauritius and Réunion, and Guito did the same to Mozambique and Madagascar.

March

In the month of March, 8 systems formed, of which 5 were named. In the Australian basin, Cyclone Gillian was the second most powerful cyclone of the 2013–14 Australian region cyclone season and the strongest in the basin in the last four years. 17F, Lusi, Mike, and 21F formed in the South Pacific basin while Caloy formed in the West Pacific basin near the Philippines.

April

In the month of April, 7 systems formed, the second-least active month of this year; however, 5 storms were named. Severe Tropical Cyclone Ita was the strongest tropical cyclone in the Australian region by minimum central pressure since George in 2007, and since Monica in 2006 by wind speed. In the Australian basin, including Ita, 2 more systems formed: Jack and a weak 17U. Ivanoe formed in the South-West Indian Ocean basin, while Peipah (Domeng), a weak tropical depression, and Tapah existed in the West Pacific basin.

May

May was an extremely inactive month worldwide despite of the current El Niño event, with two tropical cyclones forming. One of them is BOB 02, which is a depression that brought relief to Odisha, which had been suffering from a heat wave that claimed 22 lives. Coastal areas previously reporting temperatures near  fell below  during the system's passage.

June

July

August

September

October

November

A total of 7 storms formed within the month of November, of which 4 were named. Typhoon Hagupit was the strongest storm of the month and the second-most intense storm of the year, impacting the Philippines a few weeks after Sinlaku affected the Philippines as a tropical depression. Cyclone Qendresa was a rare system that caused damages and 3 deaths in Italy.

December

Global effects

Notes

1 Only systems that formed either on or after January 1, 2014 are counted in the seasonal totals.
2 Only systems that formed either before or on December 31, 2014 are counted in the seasonal totals.3 The wind speeds for this tropical cyclone/basin are based on the IMD Scale which uses 3-minute sustained winds.
4 The wind speeds for this tropical cyclone/basin are based on the Saffir Simpson Scale which uses 1-minute sustained winds.5The wind speeds for this tropical cyclone are based on Météo-France which uses gust winds.

See also

 Tropical cyclones by year
 List of earthquakes in 2014
 Tornadoes of 2014

References

External links 

Regional Specialized Meteorological Centers
 US National Hurricane Center – North Atlantic, Eastern Pacific
 Central Pacific Hurricane Center – Central Pacific
 Japan Meteorological Agency – NW Pacific
 India Meteorological Department – Bay of Bengal and the Arabian Sea
 Météo-France – La Reunion – South Indian Ocean from 30°E to 90°E
 Fiji Meteorological Service – South Pacific west of 160°E, north of 25° S

Tropical Cyclone Warning Centers
 Meteorology, Climatology, and Geophysical Agency of Indonesia – South Indian Ocean from 90°E to 141°E, generally north of 10°S
 Australian Bureau of Meteorology (TCWC's Perth, Darwin & Brisbane) – South Indian Ocean & South Pacific Ocean from 90°E to 160°E, generally south of 10°S
 Papua New Guinea National Weather Service – South Pacific Ocean from 141°E to 160°E, generally north of 10°S
 Meteorological Service of New Zealand Limited – South Pacific west of 160°E, south of 25°S

 
Tropical cyclones by year
2014 Atlantic hurricane season
2014 Pacific hurricane season
2014 Pacific typhoon season
2014 North Indian Ocean cyclone season
2013–14 Australian region cyclone season
2014–15 Australian region cyclone season
2013–14 South Pacific cyclone season
2014–15 South Pacific cyclone season
2013–14 South-West Indian Ocean cyclone season
2014–15 South-West Indian Ocean cyclone season
2014-related lists